Lake Viola is a round natural lake in northern Highlands County, Florida.  It is directly north of the city of Avon Park, Florida.  Lake Viola has a surface area of fifty-six acres and a maximum depth of twenty-six feet.

This lake has many residences on its shore, especially on the east side.  It has a public boat ramp on its northwest shore.  It has a tiny swimming beach on its northeast shore, but this appears to be only for the use of lake residents.  Since there is a boat ramp, public fishing is allowed by boat.  The only public access to the lake is via the boat ramp.

References

Viola
Viola